Xiaolin Showdown is an American animated television series created by Christy Hui for Kids' WB, a programming block on The WB that aired on Saturday mornings and weekday afternoons. Premiering on November 1, 2003, the series ran for three seasons until its series finale aired on May 13, 2006, in the United States. The episodes are listed in order of their production number with the date that they originally aired on Kids' WB.

Series overview

Episodes

Season 1 (2003–04)

Season 2 (2004–05) 
Episodes 214, 215, and 216 were premiered in non-production order in USA. Season 2 is divided into 2 seasons in UK.

Season 3 (2005–06) 
The episodes Time After Time (1) and Time After Time (2) first aired in United Kingdom on March 14 and 15, in Brazil on April 17 and 18, and later in its original country, USA, on May 6 and 13.

References

External links
 

Xiaolin Showdown
Lists of American children's animated television series episodes